Michael Johnson Parkes (born 24 September 1931 in Richmond, Surrey; died 28 August 1977 near Riva presso Chieri, Italy) was a British racing driver, from England. Parkes was born into an automotive background as his father John, was Chairman of the Alvis Group.

He participated in seven Formula One World Championship Grands Prix, debuting on 18 July 1959.  He achieved two podiums, and scored a total of 14 championship points.  He also secured one pole position. When not racing cars, Parkes worked as an automotive engineer, and whilst working for the Rootes Group was involved in the project which led to production of the Hillman Imp.

Sports car career
Parkes began his racing career in the mid-1950s initially with an MG before moving on to a Frazer Nash. In 1957 he raced a Lotus and came to the attention of Colin Chapman who invited him to act as reserve driver for the works team at Le Mans. He then became involved with the Fry Formula Two project in 1958 and 1959, before returning to sportscars in 1960.

In 1960 Parkes drove a Lotus Elite for Sir Gawaine Baillie before moving to Tommy Sopwith's Equipe Endeavour in 1961, where he drove in sportscars and Formula Junior. He also drove a Ferrari GT for UK Ferrari franchise, Maranello Concessionaires. At Le Mans he shared a three-litre Ferrari Testa Rossa with Willy Mairesse and finished second.

In May 1962, Mairesse and Parkes came second in the 1000km Nürburgring race in a Ferrari behind the winning car of the same marque driven by Phil Hill and Olivier Gendebien. Parkes finished a mere car length
behind Graham Hill in the 28th Royal Automobile Club tourist trophy race in August 1963. Umberto Maglioli and Parkes drove one of the Ferraris which claimed the top five
qualifying positions for the 1964 12 Hours of Sebring. The Ferraris were equipped with new power plants. Parkes was timed at 3:10.4. In the race Parkes established a speed record and completed the most miles ever for a winner.

Parkes and Maglioli, finished a considerable distance ahead of the Ferrari of Ludovico Scarfiotti and Nino Vaccarella. Parkes teamed with Jean Guichet in
a Ferrari to capture the 1,000 kilometer Classic of Monza Italy in April 1965. Tommy Spichiger, 30, of Switzerland, died instantly on the 34th lap of the race when his Ferrari 365 prototype went off the track and burst into flames. Parkes and Guichet led most of the race in their Ferrari prototype, after taking the lead from John Surtees and Ludovico Scarfiotti. Parkes and Guichet placed 2nd to Surtees and Scarfiotti in a 620-mile race at the Nürburgring in May 1965. The winning pair led the full 44 laps. It was a 4th consecutive victory for Ferrari. Dan Gurney eclipsed the time of Parkes in the sole factory Ferrari in the final practice for the 1966 12 Hours of Sebring. The blue Ford was clocked at 2:54.6, 2 seconds faster than a lap run by Parkes the previous day. In a Ferrari P3 prototype, Parkes lap was so fast that none of the time-speed conversion charts would accept it. Parkes and Bob Bondurant started 2nd after Gurney and his co-driver, Jerry Grant. Surtees and Parkes were in a Ferrari prototype in their victory
in a 620-mile Monza sports car event in April 1966. Chris Amon and Lorenzo Bandini were triumphant in a 100 lap, 1,000 kilometer Monza race in April 1967. They drove a four-litre Ferrari for an average speed of 122.30 m.p.h. Parkes and Scarfiotti finished second with a time of 5:10:59.2. The winning time was 5 hours seven minutes, 43 seconds. The Ferraris were in front after the Chaparrals of Phil Hill and Mike Spence had to make pit stops following the 17th and 18th laps. He finished second at the 1967 24 Hours of Le Mans, paired with Ludovico Scarfiotti, in a Ferrari 330P4. After the crash at the Spa Belgian GP 1967 Parkes returned to race sport cars events in 1970, with remarkable 4th place at the Daytona 24 hours on a Ferrari 312P entered by NART (paired with Sam Posey), at Sebring 12 hours he finished 6th on the same car (together with Chuck Parsons). He continued the season racing on the Filipinetti Ferrari 512S, reaching 5th place at the Targa Florio and 4th at the Nurburgring 1000 km together with Herbert Muller. Parkes competed in a 1,000 kilometer sports car race in Argentina in January 1971, he was just ahead of Ignazio Giunti's Ferrari 312PB when the Italian driver crashed on the Beltoise's Matra. He was paired with Joakim Bonnier in a five-litre Ferrari entered and owned by the Swiss Filippinetti stable which maintained operations in Modena. Parkes competed in the 1971 24 Hours of Le Mans in a modified Ferrari 512M paired with Henri Pescarolo. He was involved in the development of this car (named 512F, where "F" stands for Filipinetti, the car's owner), which proved to be very fast, winning a non-championship race at Vallelunga, Rome ahead of the Jo Siffert Porsche 917K. Parkes-Pescarolo were running well at Le Mans when a mechanical failure during the night ended their race. Parkes came back to Le Mans in 1972 with a Ferrari 365GTB entered by Filipinetti. His teammates were Lafosse and Cochet, the trio finished in seventh place, third in the GT class behind two other Ferraris.

Formula One career

Parkes first entered a World Championship Grand Prix at Aintree in 1959 driving a Formula 2 (F2) Fry-Climax 1.5-litre Straight-4. However he did not qualify and returned to sportscars thereafter, apart from a single outing at Mallory Park in 1962 with a Bowmaker Cooper. Following his success with Ferrari sportscars, Parkes joined Ferrari officially, in 1963 as development and reserve driver, and over the following seasons became recognised as a leading sports car driver. When John Surtees unexpectedly left Ferrari in 1966, Parkes was promoted to the Grand Prix team and with an extended chassis to accommodate his height of six feet four inches, was immediately successful, finishing in second place in the 1966 French Grand Prix at Reims. Jack Brabham won the race with his teammate, Denny Hulme, third, in their Brabham–Repcos. However this was followed by two retirements before another second place at Monza where he also took pole position. Parkes won an international Formula One race at Silverstone by one third of a lap over Brabham in April 1967.The 52 lap race was the first Formula One contest for Parkes in his native country. He completed the 152.36 mile competition in 1:19:39.25 with an average speed of 114.65 m.p.h. 
In 1967, Parkes competed in two further Grands Prix for Ferrari finishing fifth at Zandvoort but retiring through accident at Spa, after sliding on oil being sprayed from Jackie Stewart's H16 BRM, on the first lap, suffering broken legs that would ultimately end his Grand Prix career.
Ferrari Auto Works entered two cars in the 1967 Syracuse Grand Prix. This was a Formula One race that did not count toward the Formula One World Championship. Parkes and Scarfiotti were assigned 1966 model single seaters.
After Parkes' Formula One career ended, he raced into the 1970s in sports cars.

Parkes was killed in a road accident near Turin, Italy on 28 August 1977.

Racing record

Complete Formula One World Championship results
(key) (Races in bold indicate pole position)

Non-Championship Formula One results
(key) (Races in bold indicate pole position)
(Races in italics indicate fastest lap)

Complete British Saloon Car Championship results
(key) (Races in bold indicate pole position; races in italics indicate fastest lap.)

 Car over 1000cc – Not eligible for points.

Automotive engineering
Parkes worked for the Rootes Group from 1950 to 1962, initially as an apprentice. One of his roles at Rootes was as project engineer in the development of the Hillman Imp.

In 1963 Parkes joined Ferrari as development engineer for their road cars, notably the 330 GTC, and also as a GT sports car driver.  Following his absence from work after his serious F1 accident, he returned to Ferrari in 1969 to find the company partly under the control of Fiat and at that point decided to work for Scuderia Filipinetti as engineer as well as driver. His departure from Ferrari was partly due to Enzo Ferrari's refusal to allow him to return to F1 after his accident, claiming that he was too valuable as an engineer.

In 1974 Parkes took a job as principal development engineer for the Lancia Stratos.

References

External links
www.mikeparkes.eu This is the official biography created by Parkes' sister and brother, namely Annabel Campigotto and Johnny Parkes and includes over 150 photos.
Mike Parkes, biography at imps4ever.info

1931 births
1977 deaths
English racing drivers
English Formula One drivers
Fry Formula One drivers
Ferrari Formula One drivers
British Touring Car Championship drivers
Road incident deaths in Italy
24 Hours of Le Mans drivers
World Sportscar Championship drivers
24 Hours of Daytona drivers
12 Hours of Sebring drivers